The Velju Mare (in its lower course also Valea Mare) is a left tributary of the river Corhana in Romania. Near Inand much of its flow is diverted by the Criș Collector Canal towards the Crișul Negru near Tămașda.

References

Rivers of Romania
Rivers of Bihor County